Hosakatti is a village in Dharwad district of Karnataka, India.

Demographics 
As of the 2011 Census of India there were 269 households in Hosakatti and a total population of 1,229 consisting of 656 males and 573 females. There were 151 children ages 0-6.

References

Villages in Dharwad district